Gravel Run is a tributary of Black Creek in Luzerne County, Pennsylvania, in the United States. The stream drains part of the city of Hazleton. In the early 1900s, it was polluted by acid mine drainage. A borehole was dug near the mouth of the stream in the late 1800s.

Course
Gravel Run begins in Hazle Township, very near the city of Hazleton. It flows northwest for a few tenths of a mile before turning north. Over the next few tenths of a mile, the stream passes near the Hazleton Area High School and flows down a small hill. A short distance further downstream, it reaches its confluence with Black Creek.

Hydrology, geography and geology

A report by the Pennsylvania Department of Health in the early 1900s described Gravel Run as being a small stream.

The top  consisted of surface wash and dark slate. The next  contained coal with slate, soft gray sandy shale, pulverized rock and sand, gray shale and graphite, pulverized rock and coal, brown sandy clay and pulverized rock, light red and yellow-brown shale, and fine gray sandstone, in that order. The next  consisted of dark gray sandstone and coarse gray sandstone with pebbles, in that order. The final  contained gray sandstone, gray sandstone with pebbles, and gray sandstone with coal slate, in that order. Overall, the borehole revealed 38 different strata.

Gravel Run, like many streams in its vicinity, was polluted by acid mine drainage in the early 1900s. The acid mine drainage came from mines in and near the city of Hazleton.

Watershed
Gravel Run is entirely within the United States Geological Survey quadrangle of Hazleton. It drains a portion of the northwestern part of the city of Hazleton. It drains the older part of the city as well as the Green Ridge Territory.

Gravel Run is one of eleven officially named streams in the watershed of Nescopeck Creek that has not been assessed by the Pennsylvania Fish and Boat Commission.

History
Gravel Run was entered into the Geographic Names Information System on January 1, 1990. Its identifier in the Geographic Names Information System is 1202232. The stream appears in the Atlas of the Anthracite Coalfields of Pennsylvania, which was published in 1888.

Historically, the Pennsylvania Railroad owned a tract of land in the vicinity of Gravel Run. A diamond drill borehole was once dug on this property near the mouth of the stream. The sewers of Hazleton historically discharged into Black Creek via Gravel Run. In the early 1900s, there was a well near the headwaters of Gravel Run.

See also
Stony Creek (Black Creek), next tributary of Black Creek going downstream
Little Black Creek, next tributary of Black Creek going upstream
List of rivers of Pennsylvania

References

Rivers of Luzerne County, Pennsylvania
Tributaries of Nescopeck Creek
Rivers of Pennsylvania